The Museum of Art and Digital Entertainment (stylized as The MADE) is an Oakland, California, museum dedicated to digital art and gaming, with fully playable gaming exhibits. 
Its mission is to collect and curate video games, digital media concept art, and gaming systems, to teach the public about digital art and the process of gaming creation.

The Board of Directors and Board of Advisors are composed largely of veterans of the gaming industry, journalists, experts, and historians of the field. The museum's director is the internationally published technology journalist Alex Handy, with Dr. Henry Lowood, Curator of Stanford University History of Science & Technology Collections and Film & Media Collections serving on the board of directors.

In September 2015, the museum launched a Kickstarter campaign to acquire a venue in San Francisco, California, across the bay.

In June 2022, after being closed for two years due to the COVID-19 pandemic, the museum reopened in a new location in downtown Oakland.

Scratch programming 
The MADE offers two free Scratch programming workshops every Saturday from 10:00 AM to 1:00 PM with some breaks in-between. Students have a choice of signing up for a class on video game programming, computer art, or both. No programming experience is required and a new student can join any session. The MADE maintains that a student must be at least 9 years old to participate in the workshop.

NeoHabitat 
NeoHabitat is an open source project headed by The MADE to revive and restore Habitat to its original state from 1986. The project is hosted on GitHub and is in need of volunteers.

Events 
Game jams and Super Smash Bros tournaments are regularly hosted by the MADE.

References

External links 
 Official Museum of Art and Digital Entertainment website

Museums in Oakland, California
Proposed museums in the United States
Computer museums in California
Amusement museums in the United States
Video game museums
2010 establishments in California
Museums established in 2010
Museums of digital art